Urak Lawoi are an Aboriginal Malay people residing on the islands of Phuket, Phi Phi, Jum, Lanta, Bulon and on Lipe and Adang, in the Adang Archipelago, off the western coast of Thailand. They are known by various names, including Orak Lawoi', Lawta, Chao Tha Le, Chao Nam, and Lawoi.

The population of approximately 6,000 speak a language related closely to Malay but influenced by Thai. The Urak Lawoi are one of several southeast Asian ethnicities referred to as "Sea Gypsies" (chao leh in Thai). The local way of life has been changing rapidly in recent years, due to the rapid encroachment of the market economy, and the opening of Tarutao National Marine Park.

See also
Sea Gypsies (disambiguation)

References

Ethnic groups in Thailand
Nomadic groups in Eurasia